David Neil Corfield is a British philosopher specializing in philosophy of mathematics and philosophy of psychology. He is Senior Lecturer in Philosophy at the University of Kent.

Education
Corfield studied mathematics at the University of Cambridge, and later earned his MSc and PhD in the philosophy of science and mathematics at King's College London. His doctoral advisor was Donald A. Gillies.

Work
Corfield is the author of Towards a Philosophy of Real Mathematics (2003), in which he argues that the philosophical implications of mathematics did not stop with Kurt Gödel's incompleteness theorems. He has also co-authored a book with Darian Leader about psychology and psychosomatic medicine, Why Do People Get Ill? (2007).

He joined the University of Kent in September 2007 in which he is currently a Senior Lecturer.

He is a member of the informal steering committee of nLab, a wiki-lab for collaborative work on mathematics, physics, and philosophy.

Bibliography
 "Assaying Lakatos's Philosophy of Mathematics", Studies in History and Philosophy of Science 28(1), 99–121 (1997).
 "Beyond the Methodology of Mathematical Research Programmes", Philosophia Mathematica  6, 272–301 (1998).
 "Come the Revolution...", critical notice on The Principles of Mathematics Revisited by Jaakko Hintikka, Philosophical Books 39(3), 150–6 (1998).
 "The Importance of Mathematical Conceptualisation", Studies in History and Philosophy of Science 32(3), 507–533 (2001).
 "Bayesianism in Mathematics", in Corfield D. and Williamson J. (eds.) (2001), 175–201.
 (with J. Williamson), "Bayesianism into the 21st Century", in Corfield D. and Williamson J. (eds.) (2001), 1–16.
 Corfield D. and Williamson J. (eds.),  Foundations of Bayesianism, Kluwer Applied Logic Series (2001).
 "Argumentation and the Mathematical Process", G. Kampis, L. Kvasz & M. Stöltzner (eds.) Appraising Lakatos: Mathematics, Methodology, and the Man, 115–138. Kluwer, Dordrecht (2002).
 Review of Conceptual Mathematics by F. W. Lawvere and S. Schanuel and A Primer of Infinitesimal Analysis by J. Bell,  Studies in History and Philosophy of Modern Physics, 33B(2), 359–366 (2002).
 "From Mathematics to Psychology: Lacan's Missed Encounters" in J. Glynos and Y. Stavrakakis (eds.) Lacan and Science, Karnac Books, 179–206 (2002).
 Towards a Philosophy of Real Mathematics, Cambridge University Press (2003).
 Review of Opening Skinner's Box by Lauren Slater, The Guardian, 27 March 2004.
 Review of 
 "Categorification as a Heuristic Device", in D. Gillies and C. Cellucci (eds.), Mathematical Reasoning and Heuristics, King's College Publications (2005).
 "Some Implications of the Adoption of Category Theory for Philosophy", in Giandomenico Sica (ed.), What is Category Theory?, Polimetrica (2006), 75–94.
 (with Darian Leader) Why Do People Get Ill?, Hamish Hamilton (2007).
 
 Modal Homotopy Type Theory: The Prospect of a New Logic for Philosophy, Oxford University Press (2020).

References

External links
 Faculty page at the University of Kent
 Home page in nLab
 Philosophy/mathematics group blog "The n-Category Cafe", written by Corfield, John Baez, Urs Schreiber and Alex Hoffnung
 Internet Archive of Corfield's old blog, "Philosophy of Real Mathematics" (last version)
 His psychosomatic medicine blog, "Why Do People Get Ill?"
 Homepage in Tübingen
 His alumnus page at the Max Planck Institut
 Mazur interviewed by Corfield - Thales + Friends

Year of birth missing (living people)
Living people
21st-century British philosophers
Philosophers of mathematics
Academics of the University of Kent
Science bloggers